Mikkel Parlo (born May 3, 1990) is a Danish retired mixed martial artist who last competed in the Middleweight division of Bellator MMA.

Mixed martial arts career

Early career
Parlo began competing as an amateur in 2008, compiling a record of 3-0. He then started his professional career in 2010. He fought only for Danish promotions as Fighter Gala and Royal Arena.

In 2012, with a record of 8-0, Parlo signed with Bellator.

Bellator MMA
Parlo was expected face Ali Mokdad on October 12, 2012, at Bellator 76. However, Parlo was replaced by Simon Marini due to undisclosed reasons.

Parlo made his promotional debut against Jared Combs on October 26, 2012, at Bellator 78. He won via knockout in the first round.

Parlo faced Sultan Aliev on February 14, 2013, at Bellator 89 in the quarterfinals of Bellator season eight middleweight tournament. Aliev defeated Parlo via unanimous decision (29-28, 29-28, 29-28).

Parlo faced Brian Rogers on September 7, 2013, at Bellator 98 in the quarterfinals of Bellator season nine middleweight tournament. He won via unanimous decision (30-27, 30-26, 30-26).

Parlo faced Jason Butcher in the semifinal on October 4, 2013, at Bellator 102. He won the fight via unanimous decision (30-27, 29-28, 29-28).

Parlo faced Brennan Ward in the finals on November 8, 2013, at Bellator 107. Despite controlling the first round, Parlo lost the fight via a TKO in the second round.

He then faced Johnny Cisneros at Bellator 115 on April 4, 2014. Parlo won via unanimous decision.

Championships and accomplishments
Bellator MMA
Bellator Season 9 Middleweight Tournament Runner-Up
Royal Arena
Royal Arena Middleweight Championship (One time)

Mixed martial arts record

|-
|Loss
|align=center|13–3
|Chris Honeycutt
|Decision (unanimous)
|Bellator 156
|
|align=center|3
|align=center|5:00
|Fresno, California, United States
|
|-
|Win
|align=center|13–2
|Abusupiyan Magomedov
|Decision (unanimous)
|German MMA Championship 7
|
|align=center|3
|align=center|5:00
|Castrop-Rauxel, Germany
|181 Pound Catchweight
|-
|Win
|align=center|12–2
|Johnny Cisneros
|Decision (unanimous)
|Bellator 115
|
|align=center|3
|align=center|5:00
|Reno, Nevada, United States
|
|-
|Loss
|align=center|11–2
|Brennan Ward
|TKO (punches)
|Bellator 107
|
|align=center| 2
|align=center| 1:39
|Thackerville, Oklahoma, United States
|
|-
|Win
|align=center|11–1
|Jason Butcher
|Decision (unanimous)
|Bellator 102
|
|align=center|3
|align=center|5:00
|Visalia, California, United States
|
|-
|Win
|align=center|10–1
|Brian Rogers
|Decision (unanimous)
|Bellator 98
|
|align=center|3
|align=center|5:00
|Charlotte, North Carolina, United States
|
|-
|Loss
|align=center|9–1
|Sultan Aliev
|Decision (unanimous)
|Bellator 89
|
|align=center|3
|align=center|5:00
|Charlotte, North Carolina, United States
|
|-
|Win
|align=center|9–0
|Jared Combs
|KO (punches)
|Bellator 78
|
|align=center|1
|align=center|3:51
|Dayton, Ohio, United States
|
|-
|Win
|align=center|8–0
|Simon Carlsen
|KO (punches)
|Royal Arena 2
|
|align=center|2
|align=center|1:28
|Copenhagen, Denmark
|
|-
|Win
|align=center|7–0
|Martin Tondryk
|TKO (kick to the body and punches)
|Royal Arena 1
|
|align=center|1
|align=center|2:06
|Brøndby, Denmark
|
|-
|Win
|align=center|6–0
|Gregor Herb
|Decision (unanimous)
|Cage Fight Live 2
|
|align=center|3
|align=center|5:00
|Herning, Denmark
|
|-
|Win
|align=center|5–0
|Dan Edwards
|KO (punch)
|Fighter Gala 20: Locked & Loaded
|
|align=center|1
|align=center|0:12
|Copenhagen, Denmark
|
|-
|Win
|align=center|4–0
|Vincent del Guerra
|Submission (arm-triangle choke)
|Fighter Gala 18: No Fear
|
|align=center|1
|align=center|3:54
|Odense, Denmark
|
|-
|Win
|align=center|3–0
|Martin Lavin
|TKO (punches)
|Fighter Gala 16: Bad Boys
|
|align=center|3
|align=center|3:13
|Helsingør, Denmark
|
|-
|Win
|align=center|2–0
|Josef Kral
|TKO (punches)
|Fighter Gala 13: Raw
|
|align=center|2
|align=center|3:00
|Copenhagen, Denmark
|
|-
|Win
|align=center|1–0
|Willem Peters
|TKO (punches)
|Fighter Gala 12: Night of Champions
|
|align=center|1
|align=center|2:40
|Odense, Denmark
|

Mixed martial arts amateur record

|-
|Win
|align=center|2–0
|Regin Koop
|Submission (rear-naked choke)
|Fighter Gala 11
|
|align=center|1
|align=center|1:58
|Odense, Denmark
|
|-
|Win
|align=center|1–0
|Lars Auer
|Submission
|Fighter Gala 8: High Stakes
|
|align=center|1
|align=center|N/A
|Odense, Denmark
|

References

1990 births
Living people
Danish male mixed martial artists
Danish people of Finnish descent
Middleweight mixed martial artists
Sportspeople from Copenhagen